The Master of Jannecke Bollengier was a Flemish painter of illuminated manuscripts active in the area around Ghent, or possibly Bruges, around 1500.  His name is derived from an entry in a Book of Hours, now in the treasury of the Collégiale Sainte Waudru, identifying it as the property of one Jannecke Bollengier.  Comparable books in similar style exist in other library and museum collections; their association with the Master, however, remains unclear.  In addition, the book bears certain stylistic similarities with the work of the so-called Master of the Dresden Prayerbook.

Early Netherlandish painters
Manuscript illuminators
Jannecke Bollengier, Master of